David Kevin Wato Rumakiek (born 18 July 1999) is an Indonesian professional footballer who plays as a full-back for Liga 1 club Persib Bandung. He is the older brother of Ramai Rumakiek.

Club career

Persipura Jayapura
He was signed for Persipura Jayapura to play in Liga 1 in the 2017 season. Rumakiek made his professional league debut on 24 March 2018 in a match against Persela Lamongan at the Mandala Stadium, Jayapura.

Persib Bandung
Rumakiek was signed for Persib Bandung to play in Liga 1 in the 2022–23 season. He made his league debut on 16 September 2022 in a match against Barito Putera at the Gelora Bandung Lautan Api Stadium, Bandung.

International career
In 2018, Rumakiek represented the Indonesia U-19, in the 2018 AFC U-19 Championship.

Career statistics

Club

Honours

International 
Indonesia U-19
 AFF U-19 Youth Championship third place: 2018

References

External links
 
 David Rumakiek at Liga Indonesia

1999 births
Living people
Indonesian footballers
Persipura Jayapura players
Persib Bandung players
Liga 1 (Indonesia) players
Indonesia youth international footballers
Association football defenders
People from Jayapura
Sportspeople from Papua